Felda is an unincorporated community in Hendry County, Florida, United States, located east of Fort Myers, on State Road 29. The name is a portmanteau of Felix and Ida Taylor's first names.

Geography

Economy
The area was once known for its tomato and cucumber production.

See also
 List of geographic names derived from portmanteaus

References

Unincorporated communities in Hendry County, Florida
Unincorporated communities in Florida